Matthew Duke may refer to:

Matt Duke (born 1977), English football goalkeeper
Matt Duke (musician) (born 1985), American musician and singer-songwriter 
Matthew Edward Duke (died 1960), American pilot and smuggler who was gunned down in Cuba